Siedlęcin  is a village in the administrative district of Gmina Jeżów Sudecki, within Jelenia Góra County, Lower Silesian Voivodeship, in south-western Poland.

The most important historical monument in Siedlęcin is the 14th century Siedlęcin Tower. The river Bóbr runs through the lower part of the village.

References

External links
Dagmara Adamska, Siedlęcin, czyli „wieś Rudigera”. Studia nad średniowiecznym osadnictwem wokół Jeleniej Góry, In: Wieża książęca w Siedlęcinie w świetle dotychczasowych badań. Podsumowanie na 700-lecie budowy obiektu, ed. P. Nocuń, Kraków 2016

Villages in Karkonosze County